NMRC may refer to:
Maharashtra Metro Rail Corporation (MahaMetro), formerly Nagpur Metro Rail Corporation (NMRC)
Naval Medical Research Center
Noida Metro Rail Corporation
Nigeria Mortgage Refinance Company